"I Got It Goin' On" is the third and final single from Tone Loc's 1989 album Lōc-ed After Dark. While not as successful as the earlier singles "Wild Thing" and "Funky Cold Medina", it reached number 18 on the US Hot Rap Singles chart and number 59 on the Top R&B Singles chart in the summer of 1989. It eventually sold over 600,000 Singles(Gold).

Track listing
Vinyl
"I Got It Goin' On" (Remix) – 4:22 
"I Got It Goin' On" (Go Go Instrumental) – 4:36 
"The Homies" (Album Version) – 4:03
"The Homies" (On Tilt Mix) – 2:20 
"The Fine Line Between Hyper and Stupid" featuring Akeem, Aleem & Hashim – 4:00

CD
"I Got It Goin' On" (Remix Edit) – 3:47 
"The Homies" – 2:20 
"The Fine Line Between Hyper and Stupid" featuring Akeem, Aleem & Hashim – 4:00
"Cheeba Cheeba" – 6:10

References

Tone Lōc songs
1989 songs
Delicious Vinyl singles